"Join the Club" is the 67th episode overall and the second episode of the sixth season of the HBO television drama series The Sopranos. Written by series creator/executive producer David Chase and directed by David Nutter, it premiered on March 19, 2006 in the United States.

Starring 
 James Gandolfini as Tony Soprano / Kevin Finnerty
 Lorraine Bracco as Dr. Jennifer Melfi * 
 Edie Falco as Carmela Soprano
 Michael Imperioli as Christopher Moltisanti
 Dominic Chianese as Corrado Soprano, Jr. 
 Steven Van Zandt as Silvio Dante
 Tony Sirico as Paulie Gualtieri
 Robert Iler as Anthony Soprano, Jr. 
 Jamie-Lynn Sigler as Meadow Soprano
 Aida Turturro as Janice Soprano Baccalieri 
 Steven R. Schirripa as Bobby Baccalieri
 Joseph R. Gannascoli as Vito Spatafore
 Dan Grimaldi as Patsy Parisi

* = credit only

Guest starring 
Jerry Adler as Hesh Rabkin

Also guest starring

Synopsis

Two days after being shot by Junior, Tony remains in an induced coma. Doctors encourage Carmela and others to talk to him and play him music in hope of recovery. However, they also warn that he could die or be left with brain damage. Carmela, Christopher, Meadow and Barbara keep a vigil over Tony, while Janice sobs uncontrollably whenever she sees him. Meanwhile, a confused Junior is held in custody and denies that he shot his nephew. Silvio assumes Tony's responsibilities as acting boss, and it is decided to cut Junior off from the Soprano family, making Tony the official boss. Chris, Paulie, and Vito vie for small opportunities to assist Tony's family during the crisis, such as sending presents to his room and bickering over giving a ride home to A.J.

Alone with Tony, Carmela passionately expresses her love for him. Meadow reads him a translation of the poem Pater Noster by Jacques Prévert. Meanwhile, A.J. becomes increasingly withdrawn and avoids Tony's hospital room, claiming to have a stomach flu. He admits to Meadow that he is embarrassed and angered by the actions of his family. A.J. finally gathers enough courage to talk to his comatose father when they are alone, and vows to kill Junior. Afterward, he admits to Carmela that he flunked junior college. She looks at him in stunned disbelief but holds in her anger and sends him away.

At Satriale's, Chris encounters FBI Agents Harris and Goddard, who ask him to pass along any information he might hear about terrorist activities. At the Bada Bing, he talks briefly with two Arab men who are now regulars there.

While he is in a coma, Tony has a long dream-like experience that is woven through the episode.

Tony awakens as a precision optics salesman, without his New Jersey accent, in a hotel room in Costa Mesa, California. That night, he notices a strange light glowing on the horizon as he looks out the window, and at the hotel bar watches a news report about a nearby brush fire. The next morning, he goes to a convention and is asked for ID to gain admittance. Tony realizes that he has someone else's wallet and briefcase, belonging to a man named Kevin Finnerty from Kingman, Arizona, to whom he bears a resemblance. When he returns to a bar where he thinks he unintentionally picked up these items, some business travelers overhear him telling his story to the bartender who, when asked what Costa Mesa is like, replies, "Around here, it's dead." The group invite Tony to join them for dinner, during which he discusses his 'life' in more detail, alluding to a midlife crisis. As he and his group leave, Tony notices a religious commercial on TV, which shows the question, "Are sin, disease, and death real?" Outside the hotel, Tony makes a pass at a woman from the group. She responds at first but then cuts him off, telling him she saw his face when he got off the phone with his wife (whose voice is not Carmela's). Suddenly, a helicopter spotlight shines on the pair (the lights of the hospital surgery room). The woman says, "They must be looking for a perp."

Tony briefly awakens from his coma and rips out his breathing tube. The dream resumes when he is placed in another coma.

Tony checks into a different hotel under Finnerty's name. Two Buddhist monks overhear him checking in and, thinking he is Finnerty, confront him over installing a faulty heating system at their monastery. Tony tells them that he's not Finnerty, which angers the monks; they scuffle briefly and the monks flee, leaving Tony shocked at the violence. The next morning, the hotel elevator is out of order, so Tony takes the stairs. As he is walking down, he slips and falls; when brought to an emergency room, he is told by the doctor that aside from having a minor concussion, his MRI scan shows some dark spots on his brain caused by lack of oxygen. The doctor states that this indicates early stages of Alzheimer's disease. When the doctor leaves him, Tony says "I'm lost" to himself. After he returns to his hotel room, he picks up the phone but hangs up before dialing, while the beacon of light flashes on the horizon.

First appearances
 Ahmed and Muhammad: Muslim associates of Christopher Moltisanti who hang out at the Bada Bing.

Title reference
 In Tony's dream, when Tony tells the businessmen at the bar that he is 46 years old and does not know where "[he] is going," Lee (the woman from the business group) tells Tony to "join the club."

Production
 Most interior hospital scenes of the episode were filmed at the North Hollywood Medical Center, Los Angeles, with additional exterior and interior scenes filmed at the New Jersey Institute of Technology
 James Gandolfini uses his real voice in his comatose dream instead of Tony Soprano's strong Jersey accent.
 The interior of the hospital lunch room is actually "The Highlander Club" (formerly called "The Pub") inside the Campus Center at NJIT.
 The interior of the hospital is the same hospital from the TV show Scrubs.
 The credits do not mention the actress providing the voice of Tony's wife in his dream, though the writers have stated the voice is of a generic New Jersey actress and not intended to be anyone previously featured on the series. On the A&E syndication rebroadcast, the voice is credited on the closed captioning as 'Carmela's voice'.
 This episode was shown at the season's premiere party instead of the first installment, "Members Only."
 This is the only episode of the series directed by David Nutter and the eighth of nine episodes for which David Chase receives an individual writing credit.

References to prior episodes
 Carmela tells Tony that she regrets telling him he would go to Hell when he dies. This occurred in the pilot episode.
 Lee is curious how Tony made the jump from selling patio furniture to precision optics. Tony mentioned selling patio furniture on Route 22 as an alternative life during a conversation with Meadow in the season one episode "College," and in a therapy session with Dr. Melfi in season 1.
 When Vito Spatafore talks about Eugene Pontecorvo's suicide, he notes that perhaps Eugene killed himself because of closeted homosexuality. This is a reference to Vito's own homosexuality, which was exposed in the season five episode "Unidentified Black Males."

Other cultural references
 Vito says Junior "Marvin Gayed" his nephew, a reference to the murder of the singer Marvin Gaye by his own father.
 As a comment on A.J.'s long hair, Paulie Walnuts addresses him as "Van Helsing," (a reference to the vampire hunter in the 2004 film) and Rosalie Aprile greets him as "Fabio" (the model and advertising spokesperson of the '80s and '90s). 
 Policemen tell Carmela they have to ask her about Tony's knowledge of the Kennedy assassination after Junior mentioned some details about it to them. They reference The McGuire Sisters and Sam Giancana. The McGuire Sisters were a popular singing trio from the 1950s-1960s whose member Phyllis McGuire was noted for dating gangster Giancana.
 When Christopher meets the FBI agents at the store, he says, "Oh, Sheriff of Nottingham, my kingdom for a mortadell." This is a reference, first to the legend of Robin Hood, then to William Shakespeare's play Richard III, when, after Richard is unhorsed in the midst of battle, he desperately cries out, "A horse, a horse! My kingdom for a horse!"

Music
 The song Carmela plays for Tony in the hospital first is "Smoke on the Water" by Deep Purple. This was the same song played in the series' second season premiere, "Guy Walks Into a Psychiatrist's Office...", in a scene where Tony crashed his truck into a barricade.
 The second song Carmela is heard playing in Tony's hospital room is "There's a Moon Out Tonight" by The Capris.
 The song Carmela says she was playing in Tony's truck an entire weekend at Long Beach Island and now plays in his hospital room is "American Girl" by Tom Petty and The Heartbreakers.
 When Tony is waiting at the bar, "The Happy Organ" by Dave "Baby" Cortez can be heard. This song was also used in the season 3 episode "Fortunate Son."
 The song playing in Bada Bing is "Spitfire" by The Prodigy.
 The song playing at the end of the episode, where Tony returns to his hotel room and picks up the phone but ceases dialing, is Moby's "When It's Cold I'd Like to Die" with vocals by Mimi Goese. Just before that, while Tony is kicking off his shoes, an instrumental version of "Day After Day" is heard.

Reception
"Join the Club" was watched by 9.18 million American viewers on its premiere date.

Since its premiere, "Join the Club" has frequently been singled out by critics as one of the best episodes of the series. Edie Falco's performance was highly praised.

References

External links
"Join the Club"  at HBO

2006 American television episodes
The Sopranos (season 6) episodes
Television episodes directed by David Nutter
Television episodes written by David Chase